Mupliyam is a small village near Pudukkad town  in Thrissur district of Kerala state, south India. It is located 9 km away from NH 544 from Pudukad  which is 13 km from  Thrissur town. Mupliyam comes under Chalakudy Taluk and Varandarappilly Panchayath. The river which passes through Mupliyam becomes Kurumali river (Mupliyam river). Muniyattukunnu of Mupliyam is famous for its dolmens, which were declared as protected monument as per Government proceeding. Only one dolmen stands intact at Muniyattukunnu. The rest have been destroyed by quarrying in the area.
India.

Schools
Govt Higher Secondary School
Vimal Jyothy Central School

Churches
Assumption Church, Mupliyam
Little Flower Church,  Vellarampadam.

Temples
Madapplilli Kaavu Temple
Muthumala Sree Subramanya Swami Temple
Panchamoorthy temple
Kalleli Sree Dharma Sastha temple, Pidikkaparambu
Mahavishnu temple, Pidikkaparamb

Bank
 South Indian Bank, Mupliyam
 Inchakundu Service Cooperative Bank

Government Offices
 Village Office Mupliyam.
 Post Office Mupliyam

Primary Health Centers
 Mupliyam Government Primary Health center.
 Mupliyam Government Homeo Dispensary.

References

Cities and towns in Thrissur district
Villages in Mukundapuram Taluk